In mathematical logic, indiscernibles are objects that cannot be distinguished by any property or relation defined by a formula. Usually only first-order formulas are considered.

Examples
If a, b, and c are distinct and {a, b, c} is a set of indiscernibles, then, for example, for each binary formula , we must have

Historically, the identity of indiscernibles was one of the laws of thought of Gottfried Leibniz.

Generalizations
In some contexts one considers the more general notion of order-indiscernibles, and the term sequence of indiscernibles often refers implicitly to this weaker notion. In our example of binary formulas, to say that the triple (a, b, c) of distinct elements is a sequence of indiscernibles implies

Applications
Order-indiscernibles feature prominently in the theory of Ramsey cardinals, Erdős cardinals, and zero sharp.

See also 
Identity of indiscernibles
Rough set

References
 

Model theory